Charles Gordon (born July 30, 1968 in Tampa, Florida) is a former American/Canadian FootballLeague player who attended Eastern Michigan University from 1986–1989 earning All-Mid American Conference (MAC) honors for three consecutive years including: 1986 Runner-Up for MAC Freshman of the Year and 1986 Sporting News Freshman All America Head of the Class (Special Mention); 1987 - 1st Team All Mid-American Conference (MAC) 1987- 3rd Team Football News Sophomore All America 1987 AP All America (Honorable Mention). Helped lead Eastern Michigan University to its first and only MAC championship 10–2 overall record and 7–1 conference record. Went to the 1987 California Bowl and upset  point favorite San Jose State University for the only bowl game win in EMU history. 
School records include: 4th all time Interceptions (12), 10th all time Interception return yards, 2nd Longest Interception return in stadium history (Rynearson Stadium), 10th all time Punt Return yardage, 3rd longest Punt Return touchdown in Eastern Michigan University school history (91yds).

Professional cornerback football player in the Canadian Football League for seven years between 1991 and 1997.  Gordon played for five different teams. Signed as free agent with the Toronto Argonauts of the Canadian Football League in 1991.  Returned an interception 104 yards in a 1991 pre-season game vs Hamiltion Tiger-Cats. Was traded to the Ottawa Roughriders during 1991 rookie season. He was All Eastern Division with the Ottawa Rough Riders. Signed as a free agent with the British Columbia Lions (B.C. Lions) in 1994 and was All Western Division and a Canadian Football League Western All-Star with the British Columbia Lions.  The 1994 British Columbia Lions team defeated the Baltimore Stallions, 26-23, for the 82nd Grey Cup championship.

Charles Gordon was the 70th pick in the 1997 World League draft (NFL Europe) by the Amsterdam Admirals.

Signed as free agent with the Montreal Alouettes in 1996 he was All Eastern Division and a Canadian Football League Eastern All-Star in Montreal.

Signed as free agent with the Winnipeg Blue Bombers in 2000.

 Gordon was member of the 1994 British Columbia Lions team that defeated the Baltimore Stallions, 26-23, for the 82nd Grey Cup championship.

References

1968 births
Living people
American players of Canadian football
BC Lions players
Canadian football defensive backs
Eastern Michigan Eagles football players
Montreal Alouettes players
Ottawa Rough Riders players
Players of Canadian football from Tampa, Florida